Brett Kelly may refer to:

 Brett Kelly (actor) (born 1993), Canadian actor 
 Brett Kelly (conductor), Australian conductor and trombonist
 Brett Kelly (rugby league) (born 1983), Australian rugby league player